The metacarpophalangeal joints (MCP) are situated between the metacarpal bones and the proximal phalanges of the fingers. These joints are of the condyloid kind, formed by the reception of the rounded heads of the metacarpal bones into shallow cavities on the proximal ends of the proximal phalanges. Being condyloid, they allow the movements of flexion, extension, abduction, adduction and circumduction at the joint.

Structure

Ligaments 

Each joint has:
 palmar ligaments of metacarpophalangeal articulations
 collateral ligaments of metacarpophalangeal articulations

Dorsal surfaces
The dorsal surfaces of these joints are covered by the expansions of the Extensor tendons, together with some loose areolar tissue which connects the deep surfaces of the tendons to the bones.

Function
The movements which occur in these joints are flexion, extension, adduction, abduction, and circumduction; the movements of abduction and adduction are very limited, and cannot be performed while the fingers form a fist.

The muscles of flexion and extension are as follows:

Clinical significance
Arthritis of the MCP is a distinguishing feature of rheumatoid arthritis, as opposed to the distal interphalangeal joint in osteoarthritis.

Other animals
In many quadrupeds, particularly horses and other larger animals, the metacarpophalangeal joint is referred to as the "fetlock". This term is translated literally as "foot-lock". In fact, although the term fetlock does not specifically apply to other species' metacarpophalangeal joints (for instance, humans), the "second" or "mid-finger" knuckle of the human hand does anatomically correspond to the fetlock on larger quadrupeds. For lack of a better term, the shortened name may seem more practical.

References

External links
 
 

Joints